Loren B. Sessions (October 12, 1827 – November 20, 1897) was an American lawyer and politician from New York. He was most notable for his service in the New York State Senate from 1878 to 1881.

Life
Sessions was born in Brandon, Vermont on October 12, 1827, a son of John S. Sessions and Sally (Green) Sessions. Congressman Walter L. Sessions was his brother. His family moved to Clymer, New York in 1835, where Sessions attended the common schools, worked on his father's farm, and taught school. In 1846, he attended Westfield Academy, and in 1848 he graduated from Albany Normal School. He studied law with Lorenzo Morris in Mayville while continuing to teach school, was admitted to the bar in 1852, and practiced in Chautauqua County.

He was Deputy Clerk of the New York State Assembly in 1854, and Deputy Clerk of the New York State Senate in 1860. He was Town Supervisor of Harmony, New York from 1865 to 1870 and 1873 to 1889; and Chairman of the Board of Supervisors of Chautauqua County for seven terms.

He was a member of the New York State Senate (32nd D.) from 1878 to 1881, sitting in the 101st, 102nd, 103rd and 104th New York State Legislatures. In 1883, he was indicted and tried, for having attempted to bribe Assemblyman Samuel H. Bradley during the United States Senate special elections in New York, 1881. He was acquitted at his trial. Sessions died Panama, New York on November 20, 1897.

Sources
 Civil List and Constitutional History of the Colony and State of New York compiled by Edgar Albert Werner (1884; pg. 291)
 The State Government for 1879 by Charles G. Shanks (Weed, Parsons & Co, Albany NY, 1879; pg. 71f)
 THE LOREN B. SESSIONS CASE in NYT on October 3, 1883
 LOREN B. SESSIONS ACQUITTED in NYT on October 19, 1883
 DEATH LIST OF A DAY; Loren B. Sessions in NYT on November 21, 1897
 History of Harmony, NY transcribed from History of Chautauqua County, New York and Its People by John P. Downs & Fenwick Y. Hedley (1921), at Ray's Place

1827 births
1897 deaths
Republican Party New York (state) state senators
People from Brandon, Vermont
Town supervisors in New York (state)
People from Chautauqua County, New York
Missing middle or first names
19th-century American politicians